The 1901 New York Giants season was the franchise's 19th season. The team finished in seventh place in the National League with a 52–85 record, 37 games behind the Pittsburgh Pirates.

Regular season

Season standings

Record vs. opponents

Roster

Player stats

Batting

Starters by position 
Note: Pos = Position; G = Games played; AB = At bats; H = Hits; Avg. = Batting average; HR = Home runs; RBI = Runs batted in

Other batters 
Note: G = Games played; AB = At bats; H = Hits; Avg. = Batting average; HR = Home runs; RBI = Runs batted in

Pitching

Starting pitchers 
Note: G = Games pitched; IP = Innings pitched; W = Wins; L = Losses; ERA = Earned run average; SO = Strikeouts

Other pitchers 
Note: G = Games pitched; IP = Innings pitched; W = Wins; L = Losses; ERA = Earned run average; SO = Strikeouts

Relief pitchers 
Note: G = Games pitched; W = Wins; L = Losses; SV = Saves; ERA = Earned run average; SO = Strikeouts

External links
1901 New York Giants season at Baseball Reference
1901 New York Giants historical game recaps at www.chronicledbaseball.com

New York Giants (NL)
San Francisco Giants seasons
New York Giants season
New York Giants
1900s in Manhattan
Washington Heights, Manhattan